Elections to Wigan Council were held on 7 May 1998. One third of the council was up for election. Following the previous election there had been three by-elections held—in Aspull-Standish, Ince and Hope Carr—with all three successfully defended by Labour.

Candidate numbers improved dramatically from the preceding election, thanks mostly to the first concerted effort by the Greens, having only tested the waters previously. The Liberal Democrats fielded were, on the other hand, the sparsest from them since 1978, following a similarly poor effort the previous year—perhaps reflecting the party giving up on its previous ambitions. There were also an Independent (formerly a Conservative candidate for Bryn in the 1995 election) and the first UKIP candidate fighting Ashton-Golborne. In total all wards but Tydlesday East were contested.

Far from recovering, turnout plummeted to new depths at 17.4%. There was a general apathy emerging across the country during this period, as well as a disillusionment among Conservative voters, but with Labour's complete dominance and the only competitive party standing in less than a quarter of seats, there were evidently other factors for the lack of enthusiasm.

The dire turnout understandably had implications for the party votes, with Labour recording their second-lowest vote (the lowest being 1975), the Conservatives sinking below their rock-bottom set in 1995, and the Lib Dems gaining their worst vote since the aforementioned 1978 election—falling to fourth behind the Greens, who comfortably achieved their best vote. Voter shares were less dramatic for Labour and the Conservatives; however, the Lib Dems' share of 6.7% was their poorest since 1979 and the Greens' share was more than two-and-a-half times larger than their previous peak.

Labour survived substantial challenges against from the Independent in Ashton-Golborne and the Greens in Hope Carr, making the only gain of the night from the Lib Dems in Beech Hill. This reduced the Lib Dems to a sole councillor, losing their status as main opposition for the first time in near twenty years. With only a Liberal Democrat in another Beech Hill seat and an Independent Labour in Hindley remaining as opposition, Labour commanded a record majority of 68.

Election result

This result had the following consequences for the total number of seats on the Council after the elections:

Ward results

By-elections between 1998 and 1999

References
"Council poll results", The Guardian 9 May 1998 page 16

1998 English local elections
1998
1990s in Greater Manchester